Wymysłówka  is a village in the administrative district of Gmina Bełżyce, within Lublin County, Lublin Voivodeship, in eastern Poland.

The village has a population of 180.

References

Villages in Lublin County